Samuel Finney (1857 – 14 April 1935) was a Labour Party politician in the United Kingdom.

Life and career 
Born at Talk-o'-th'-Hill, Finney began working when he was ten years old, and later became a coal miner.  In 1881, he was appointed as checkweighman, and he also became active in the North Staffordshire Miners' Federation, serving as its president from 1888 to 1912, and then as its full-time secretary and agent.

Finney was a supporter of the Labour Party, and was elected to Burslem Town Council in 1903, and then to Stoke-on-Trent County Borough Council from its establishment.

Finney first stood for parliament defending a Labour seat at Hanley in 1912, but came third, losing the seat to the Liberal candidate.

He was elected as Member of Parliament (MP) for North West Staffordshire at a by-election in 1916, following the death of Labour MP Albert Stanley.

When that constituency was abolished at the 1918 general election, he was returned to Parliament for the new Burslem constituency. He did not contest the 1922 general election, when Andrew MacLaren held the seat for the Labour Party. He had four daughters: the son of the eldest went on to become Baron Phillips of Ellesmere, David Chilton Phillips; the youngest son of the youngest daughter is Stephen R. L. Clark.

References

External links 
 

1857 births
1935 deaths
Labour Party (UK) MPs for English constituencies
Miners' Federation of Great Britain-sponsored MPs
Trade unionists from Staffordshire
UK MPs 1910–1918
UK MPs 1918–1922